C.R. Manohar is an Indian film producer and politician known for his work exclusively in Telugu cinema and Kannada cinema. He owns the production house Tanvi Films. He has produced successful drama films such as Mahatma, Shivam, Ranga the Donga, Vajrakaya and Rogue. He is the first time MLC (JDS) from Chikkabalapura and Kolar Constituency, Karnataka.


Filmography

As Producer

References

External links
http://www.filmibeat.com/celebs/c-r-manohar.html
http://www.imdb.com/name/nm3977439/
https://chiloka.com/celebrity/c-r-manohar

Film producers from Bangalore
Telugu film producers
Living people
Kannada film producers
Hindi film producers
Tamil film producers
Malayalam film producers
1979 births
Members of the Karnataka Legislative Council